Salpicon (or salpicón, meaning "hodgepodge" or "medley" in Spanish) is a dish of one or more ingredients diced or minced and bound with a sauce or liquid. There are different versions found in Spanish and the broader Latin American cuisine. A salpicon is sometimes used as stuffing.

In Mexican cuisine and Central American cuisine, the term refers to a salad mixture containing thinly sliced or chopped flank steak, onion, oregano, chile serrano, avocado, tomatoes, and vinegar. The mixture is commonly served on tostadas, tacos or as a filling of poblano peppers. In Honduras, rabbit meat is used.

In Colombian cuisine, salpicón is a fruit cocktail beverage made with a base of watermelon and/or orange juice, which gives it its bright red color, and soda water.

Notes

References
 Le Guide Culinaire by Auguste Escoffier, Flammarion, Paris (1903)
 Larousse Gastronomique, Crown Publishers (1961)(Translated from the French, Librairie Larousse, Paris (1938))

Beef dishes
Food ingredients
Spanish cuisine
Mexican cuisine
Central American cuisine